Mordellistena curvicauda is a beetle in the genus Mordellistena of the family Mordellidae. It was described in 1873 by Kirsch.

References

curvicauda
Beetles described in 1873